Diontae "Dion" Dwayne Dixon (born December 24, 1989) is an American professional basketball player for Obras Sanitarias. He played college basketball at the University of Cincinnati.

College career
Dixon played 4 seasons of college basketball at the University of Cincinnati, with the Cincinnati Bearcats. He graduated in 2012 with a criminal justice major. Playing a total of 137 games for the Bearcats, including all 37 games in his senior year, he became the team second best scorer for the final season with 481 points (13.0 ppg) in the Big East conference of the NCAA. He tallied a college career 1,281 points, ranking 22nd in school all-time history.

Professional career
Dixon went undrafted in the 2012 NBA draft. For the 2012–13 season he signed with AEK Larnaca of Cyprus. With AEK he won the Cypriot Championship. In 26 Division A games he recorded 11.4 points, 3.5 rebounds and 2.6 assists per game.

On November 1, 2013, Dixon was selected in the 2013 NBA D-League draft by the Idaho Stampede. However, he was later waived by the Stampede on November 18, 2013.

In February 2014, he signed with Homenetmen Beirut of the Lebanese Basketball League. In 17 games he averaged 23.9 points, 4.5 rebounds and 5.5 assists per game. In Asiabasket.com county awards, he was named "Player of the Year", "Guard of the Year", "Best Import of the Year" and "Best Newcomer" in the website's "All-Lebanese League Awards 2014".

On October 29, 2014, he was signed by Macedonian club MZT Skopje. On February 27, 2015, he was released by MZT. On March 1, 2015, he re-signed with Homenetmen Beirut of the Lebanese Basketball League after a successful spell the year before. On April 28, 2015, he signed with Marinos de Anzoátegui of Venezuela.

In late October 2015, he signed with Club Sagesse in Lebanon. In February 2016, he re-joined the Marinos de Anzoátegui. He left Marinos after appearing in eleven games.

On February 11, 2017, Dixon signed with Kymis for the rest of the 2016–17 Greek Basket League season. On September 29, 2017, he joined Club Africain of the Tunisian League.

In November 2017, he signed with Libyan club Al-Ittihad Tripoli of the Libyan League. moving in 2018 to the Uruguay league playing for the Urunday Universitario. As of 2018, he played for the Indios de San Francisco.

References

External links
Eurobasket.com Profile
RealGM.com Profile

1989 births
Living people
ABA League players
AEK Larnaca B.C. players
American expatriate basketball people in Cyprus
American expatriate basketball people in the Dominican Republic
American expatriate basketball people in Greece
American expatriate basketball people in Lebanon
American expatriate basketball people in North Macedonia
American expatriate basketball people in Uruguay
American expatriate basketball people in Venezuela
American men's basketball players
Basketball players from Chicago
Cincinnati Bearcats men's basketball players
Club Africain basketball players
KK MZT Skopje players
Kymis B.C. players
Marinos B.B.C. players
Obras Sanitarias basketball players
Point guards
Sagesse SC basketball players